Alexandre-Louis Leloir (14 March 1843 – 28 January 1884) was a French painter specializing in genre and history paintings.

Life and career

Alexandre-Louis Leloir was born in Paris, France. He was born into a family with a rich artistic heritage, the son of the painter  and fashion illustrator Héloïse Colin and the grandson of the painter Alexandre-Marie Colin. His younger brother was the painter and illustrator Maurice Leloir.

Leloir received his early art education from his parents and his maternal grandfather, Alexandre Colin, who had been a pupil of Girodet. In 1860, Leloir entered the École des Beaux-Arts and made several attempts to win the prestigious Prix de Rome. In 1861, he won a Second Grand Prix with The Death of Priam (Museum of Art and Archeology, Guéret), then again in 1862, 1863, and again won a Second Grand Prize in 1864 with Homer on the island of Scyros (Unterlinden Museum, Colmar). He received a medal at the Paris Exposition in 1878. He also distinguished himself in the competition for the painted half-figure (la demi-figure peinte) in 1864.

Specializing in historical subject matter and genre scenes, he participated in the Salon as early as 1863, with a scene of the Massacre of Innocents (Musée Bernard-d'Agesci, Niort). His work The Fight of Jacob with the Angel (Roger Quilliot Art Museum in Clermont-Ferrand) presented at the Salon of 1865 is an example of his virtuosity. From 1868, he directed his painting towards genre scenes, drawing inspiration from medieval everyday life, from the interiors of the Grand Siècle, in the Dutch manner, and in Orientalist scenes. He illustrated some editions published by Damase Jouaust, and also illustrated books by Molière and other notable authors. He participated in the foundation of the Society of French Watercolourists in 1879. He was made a Chevalier of the Legion of Honor in 1876.

Selected works

 La Mort de Priam, (Priam's Death) 1861, Guéret, Musée d'art et d'archéologie
 Véturie aux Pieds de Coriolan, (Coriolan's Journey on Foot), 1862, Location unknown
 Joseph Reconnu par ses Frères, (Joseph Recognised by his Brothers) 1863, Private Collection
 Le Massacre des Innocents, (The Massacre of the Innocents), 1863, Niort, Musée Bernard d'Agesci
 Demi Figure Peinte, (Half-figure Painted), 1864, Paris, École Nationale Supérieure des Beaux-Arts
 Homère dans l'île de Scyros, (Homer on the Island of Scyros), 1864, Colmar, Musée d'Unterlinden
 Daniel dans la Fosse aux Lions, (Daniel in the Lion's Den), 1864, Location unknown, formerly in Douai, Musée de la Chartreuse
 Lutte de Jacob et l'Ange, (Jacob Wrestling with the Angel), 1865, Clermont-Ferrand, Musée d'Art Roger-Quilliot
 Baptême des Sauvages aux îles Canaries, (Baptism of Natives in the Canary Islands), 1868, Angers, musée des Beaux-Arts
 Le Guet-apens, (The Ambush), 1869, Paris, musée du Petit-Palais
 Tentation, (Temptation), 1869, Private Collection
 Le Choix du Dîner, (Choosing the Dinner), 1872, New-York, Metropolitan Museum of Art
 Interlude Musical, (Musical Interlude), Location unknown, 1874 
 A Chariot of Swallow, Date unknown

References

External links 
Works by Leloir at the Metropolitan Museum of Art
Works by Leloir at the Rijksmuseum

19th-century French painters
French male painters
Painters from Paris
1843 births
1884 deaths
19th-century painters of historical subjects
Orientalist painters
Prix de Rome for painting
19th-century French male artists